Journey to Freedom is a 1957 American film.  The story follows a Bulgarian who escapes from behind the Iron Curtain through Istanbul, Paris and Toronto to seek freedom in Los Angeles, California, but is doggedly pursued by Communist agents.

Written and produced by Apostolof and purportedly semi-autobiographical, for his first film project he sought out exploitation veteran Dertano and the one-eyed cinematographer William C. Thompson to create "SCA Productions".  The anti-Communist tone is comparable to other films of the Red Scare:  I Married a Communist (1949), The Red Menace (1949) and Big Jim McLain (1952).

The film featured Tor Johnson, the Swedish wrestler best known for appearing in Edward D. Wood Jr.'s movies.  It was shot in the Sunset Gower Studios and picked up for distribution by Republic Pictures shortly before they suspended feature film production.

Cast 

 Jacques Scott as Stephan Raikin
 Geneviève Aumont as Nanette 
 George Graham as James Wright
 Morgan Lane as Nick Popov
 Eve Brent as Mary Raikin
 Peter Besbas as Pete
 Don Mcart as Louie
 Dan O'Dowd as Parisian Friend
 Tor Johnson as Giant Turk

References

External links 

 

1957 films
Republic Pictures films
1957 drama films
American drama films
1950s English-language films
1950s American films